Christopher Pascal Routis (born 3 March 1990) is a French professional footballer who plays as a midfielder for Swiss club Servette II. Routis has previously played for Bradford City and Ross County.

Career

Servette
Born in Bordeaux, Routis started his career at Swiss club Servette, playing for them between 2010 and 2014.

Routis made his Servette debut on 7 November 2010, in a 3–1 Challenge League home victory against Yverdon Sport FC. The following season, Routis scored his first goal for Servette in their first game back in the Swiss Super League, a 1–2 home defeat against FC Thun on 17 July 2011.

Bradford City
On 8 August 2014, it was announced that Routis would sign for Bradford City on a one-year contract. On 2 September 2014, he made his Bradford debut in the Football League Trophy in a 1–0 defeat against Oldham Athletic. He made his league debut two weeks later against Milton Keynes Dons. He made his home debut on 27 September in a 1–1 draw against Port Vale. He scored his first goal for the club on 21 October 2014, scoring in a 2–2 draw against Bristol City. He scored his second goal for the club in a 2–2 draw against Fleetwood Town on 21 March 2015. During his initial season with the club he played in a number of positions, including in midfield. He also adjusted to a language barrier. He signed a new one-year deal with the club in May 2015 after they exercised an option in his contract.

Ross County
Routis signed for Scottish Premiership club Ross County in May 2016. He made his league debut for the club on 6 August 2016 in a 3–1 home defeat to Dundee F.C. He scored his first league goal for the club on 19 November 2016 in a 4–2 away victory over St Johnstone. His goal, scored in the 38th minute, made the score 2–0 to Ross County. He left the club in May 2018, after they had been relegated from the Premiership.

Servette (2nd spell)
Routis returned to Servette after being released by Ross County in the summer of 2018.

Servette (3rd spell)
On 20 July 2022, Routis returned to Servette once again, this time joining the club's Under-21 second team that plays in the fourth-tier Swiss 1. Liga.

Career statistics

Honours
Servette 
Swiss Challenge League: 2018–19

References

External links
 

1990 births
Footballers from Bordeaux
Living people
French footballers
Association football defenders
Servette FC players
Bradford City A.F.C. players
Ross County F.C. players
FC Stade Lausanne Ouchy players
Swiss Challenge League players
Swiss Super League players
English Football League players
Scottish Premier League players
Swiss 1. Liga (football) players
French expatriate footballers
French expatriate sportspeople in Switzerland
Expatriate footballers in Switzerland
French expatriate sportspeople in England
Expatriate footballers in England
French expatriate sportspeople in Scotland
Expatriate footballers in Scotland